Kamy Sepehrnoori is Bank of America Centennial Professor in petroleum engineering at the University of Texas at Austin. He received B.S., M.S. and Ph.D. degrees from the same institution. He is a world-famous expert on computational methods, reservoir simulation and numerical solutions to partial differential equations. He has authored two books and published more than 300 technical articles and reports.

References

Living people
Year of birth missing (living people)